Peng Ping (born January 14, 1967) is a retired Chinese female basketball player who competed in the 1988 Summer Olympics and the 1992 Summer Olympics. She was a member of the China women's national basketball team that won the 1992 Olympic silver medals in basketball in Barcelona, Spain.

Family 
Her husband Song Tao is also a former Chinese basketball player, who is the first player from Asia to be drafted by an NBA team.

References 

1967 births
Living people
Chinese women's basketball players
Basketball players from Shanghai
Basketball players at the 1988 Summer Olympics
Basketball players at the 1992 Summer Olympics
Medalists at the 1992 Summer Olympics
Olympic basketball players of China
Olympic silver medalists for China
Olympic medalists in basketball
Asian Games medalists in basketball
Basketball players at the 1986 Asian Games
Basketball players at the 1990 Asian Games
Basketball players at the 1994 Asian Games
Asian Games gold medalists for China
Asian Games silver medalists for China
Asian Games bronze medalists for China
Medalists at the 1986 Asian Games
Medalists at the 1990 Asian Games
Medalists at the 1994 Asian Games